Matan Balestra (born June 4, 1992) is a former Israeli footballer that played for Maccabi Netanya and Sektzia Ness Ziona.

References

External links
 

1992 births
Living people
Israeli footballers
Ironi Tiberias F.C. players
Maccabi Netanya F.C. players
Sektzia Ness Ziona F.C. players
Footballers from Tiberias
Israeli Premier League players
Liga Leumit players
Israeli people of Italian-Jewish descent
Association football midfielders